cumgirl8 is an American post-punk band  based in Manhattan, New York, founded in 2019 by Lida Fox, Veronika Vilim, Avishag Cohen Rodrigues, and Chase Lombardo (also known as Chase Noelle). Describing themselves as a "sex-positive alien amoeba entity," they create work in the fields of music, film, publishing, and fashion. Their music functions as an "outlet [for] repressed and pent-up emotions" and their style and artistic practice are shaped by an opposition to patriarchy and capitalism. They began playing their first shows and releasing songs in the months before the outbreak of the Covid-19 Pandemic, and once in quarantine they created The 1-900, a low-fi, unfiltered talk show on YouTube that delves into sociopolitical issues with guests appearing over webcam. They are currently signed to the prominent independent label Suicide Squeeze Records who released their 2022 single "dumb bitch."

References 

Indie rock musical groups from New York (state)
American podcasters
Musical groups from Brooklyn